Raja Izuddin Chulan bin Raja Zainal Azman Shah (14 February 1951 – 28 March 2022) was the Raja Kecil Bongsu of Perak making him the sixth in the line of succession to the throne of the Malaysian state of Perak from 27 August 2016 until his death on 28 March 2022.

Death 
Raja Izuddin Chulan died of heart disease at the age of 71 at his residence in Bandar Meru Raya on 28 March 2022. He was laid to rest at the Al-Ghufran Royal Mausoleum.

References 

1951 births
2022 deaths
Royal House of Perak